Victoire Désirée Adétoro Agbanrin-Elisha (born 1944) is Benin's first female prosecutor.

Life
Victoire Agbanrin-Elisha became a judge at Cotonou's Court of First Instance in 1970. In the 1970s and 1980s she had various spells as a counsellor on the Court of Appeal. From 1981 to 1986 she served as prosecutor. In 1988 she was appointed to be a Supreme Court judge, but retired later that year.

In 1989 Agbanrin-Elisha started a practice as advocate at the Cotonou Court of Appeal. In 2003 she was shortlisted for the post of Deputy Prosecutor at the International Criminal Court (ICC). In 2009 Benin nominated her as a candidate to be a judge at the ICC.

References

1944 births
Living people
Beninese judges